Kul Badam-e Yavar (also Romanized as Kūl Bādām-e Yāvar; also known as Kūl Bādām) is a village in Tarhan-e Gharbi Rural District, Tarhan District, Kuhdasht County, Lorestan Province, Iran. At the 2006 census, its population was 123, in 22 families.

References 

Towns and villages in Kuhdasht County